Air Holland Charter B.V. was an airline based in the Netherlands. It operated passenger and cargo charters to Africa, Asia and the Mediterranean, as well as dry and wet leasing of aircraft to other airlines. It ceased operations on March 25, 2004. The airline was headquartered in Oude Meer, Haarlemmermeer.

History
Air Holland was founded in 1984 by John Block. It took a while for the airline to gain its operating certificate after KLM and Transavia Airlines attempted to stop the airline from getting it. In the early 1990s, Transavia Airlines attempted to purchase Air Holland but they were unsuccessful.

In 1991, Air Holland had to temporarily suspend all operations due to financial difficulties and a loss of DFL 30 million for the end of 1990. On the December 20, 1991, Air Holland took to the skies again under A.R. Marx's management. 

On February 20, 2004, Air Holland suspended its operations again. Its operations, flights, and aircraft were taken over by HollandExel from the Amsterdam businessman Erik de Vlieger. On March 25, 2004, the airline ceased operations due to its financial difficulties.

Fleet

Air Holland operated a fleet consisting only of Boeing aircraft. The fleet consisted of the following:

References

External links

Air Holland Fanclub and Air Holland Virtual Airline (The official fanclub and Virtual Airline of Air Holland)
Air Holland (Archive) 
Air Holland - Airlines Remembered

Defunct airlines of the Netherlands
Airlines established in 1984
Airlines disestablished in 2004
Dutch companies established in 1984
2004 disestablishments in the Netherlands